Manui is an island of the Gambier Islands of French Polynesia.

In 2015 a conservation campaign resulted in the eradication of rats from the island.

References

Islands of the Gambier Islands
Uninhabited islands of French Polynesia
Island restoration